Michał Grynberg (1909 in Sławatycze, 2000 in Warsaw) was a Polish historian of Jewish origin. A longtime associate of the Jewish Historical Institute in Warsaw, he is known for his work in compiling oral histories of Jewish victims of the Holocaust.

Works 

 2000: Sławatycze, domu mój... O życiu i zagładzie Żydów w Sławatyczach. Losy autora
 1993: Księga sprawiedliwych
 1986: Żydowska spółdzielczość pracy w Polsce w latach 1945–1949
 1984: Żydzi w rejencji ciechanowskiej 1939–1942

References

20th-century Polish historians
Polish male non-fiction writers
1909 births
2000 deaths

Writers from Warsaw